The 2010–11 season was Sport Lisboa e Benfica's 107th season in existence and the club's 77th consecutive season in the top flight of Portuguese football. It involved Benfica competing in the Primeira Liga, Taça de Portugal, Taça da Liga and the group stage of the UEFA Champions League. Benfica qualified for the Champions League by winning  the previous Primeira Liga.

In Jesus' second season, the loss of Ángel Di María and Ramires was devastating to the team. He moved Carlos Martins to the right wing as a substitute to Ramires. Nicolás Gaitán freshly landed in Europe to replace Di María. These changes had the immediate effect of breaking the high-pressure, high-tempo football of the previous years. By late September, Benfica was already trailing nine points from Porto, a difference it never recovered. 
 
In December 2010, Eduardo Salvio replaced Carlos Martins and Benfica changed to a more common 4–4–2 formation, with two out-and-out wingers to provide width, a pure attacking midfielder combined with a defensive midfielder. That decision left to a good winning streak and Jesus surpassed the record held by Jimmy Hagan's 1972–73 team, with 16 consecutive wins, including a 2–0 win at VfB Stuttgart for the season's Europa League (4–1 on aggregate), Benfica's first ever victory in Germany. As fatigue started to influence the most used players, in the only competitions the club were actively competing, Benfica was unable to maintain a 2–0 lead against Porto, and lost the chance to go the Portuguese Cup final. A 1–0 loss in Braga prevented Benfica from reaching the Europa League final. Domestically, Benfica won their third League Cup, beating Paços de Ferreira.

In January, the Portuguese winter transfer record fee was broken when David Luiz went to Chelsea for £21 million. The record was later surpassed on 31 January 2014 by another Benfica player, when Rodrigo's economic rights were sold to an investment firm for €30 million.

Competitions

Pre-season

Supertaça Cândido de Oliveira

Primeira Liga

League table

Results by round

Matches

Taça de Portugal

Semi-finals

Taça da Liga

Group stage

Knockout phase

UEFA Champions League

Group stage

UEFA Europa League

Knockout phase

Round of 32

Round of 16

Quarter-finals

Semi-finals

Overall record

Player statistics
.

|-
! colspan="15" style="background:#dcdcdc; text-align:center;"| Goalkeepers

|-
! colspan="15" style="background:#dcdcdc; text-align:center;"| Defenders

|-
! colspan="15" style="background:#dcdcdc; text-align:center;"| Midfielders

|-
! colspan="15" style="background:#dcdcdc; text-align:center;"| Strikers

|}
1.Includes 2010 Supertaça Cândido de Oliveira.
2.Includes 2010-11 UEFA Champions League

Transfers

In

Summer

Winter 

Spend :  €37,950,000

Out

Summer

Winter 

 Transfer income:  €76,800,000

Overall transfer activity

Spending
 Summer:   €34,700,000
 Winter:  €3,250,000
 Total:  €37,950,000

Income
 Summer:  €50,500,000
 Winter:  €26,300,000
 Total:  €76,800,000

Expenditure
 Summer:  €15,800,000
 Winter:  €23,050,000
 Total:  €38,850,000

Notes and references

2010-11
Portuguese football clubs 2010–11 season
2010–11 UEFA Champions League participants seasons
2010–11 UEFA Europa League participants seasons